The Jiujiang Stadium is a sports venue in Jiujiang, China. It has a capacity of 31,000 and it is used mostly for football matches. It is also used for athletics. Jiujiang Liansheng are the tenants.

References

Football venues in China
Multi-purpose stadiums in China
Jiujiang
Sports venues in Jiangxi